Celsus may refer to:

 Celsus (or Kelsos), an opponent of Christianity quoted by Origen
 Aulus Cornelius Celsus (c. 25 BC – c. 50 AD), an encyclopedist best known for his medical writings
 Aulus Marius Celsus, a Roman senator whose career began under Nero
 Tiberius Julius Celsus Polemaeanus, commonly known as Celsus (ca. 45 – before ca. 120); Roman senator, consul. Ephesus
 Publius Juventius Celsus (AD 67– AD 130), a Roman jurist, praetor, governor, consul
 Tiberius Julius Candidus Marius Celsus, aka Tiberius Julius Candidus; a Roman senator who lived during the Flavian dynasty.
 Saint Celsus (aka Celestinus or Cellach of Armagh), 1080–1129 AD); archbishop of Armagh
 Celsus and Marcionilla early Christian martyrs (in the time of Diocletian); Celsus, young son of Marcionilla.
 Celsus, a martyr; see Nazarius and Celsus: bodies discovered by Saint Ambrose.
 Celsus (usurper) (a.k.a. Titus Cornelius Celsus), a fictional Roman usurper, who supposedly rebelled against Gallienus. One of the Thirty Tyrants of Trebellius Pollio
 Library of Celsus

See also 
 Celsius (disambiguation)
 Celso (disambiguation)